Shunichi Kawano (November 29, 1936 – May 12, 2009) was a Japanese heavyweight freestyle wrestler. He won a gold medal at the 1962 Asian Games and bronze medals at the 1962 World Championships and 1966 Asian Games. He competed at the 1960, 1964 and 1968 Olympics with the best result of eighth place in 1960.

References

External links
 

1936 births
2009 deaths
Wrestlers at the 1960 Summer Olympics
Wrestlers at the 1964 Summer Olympics
Wrestlers at the 1968 Summer Olympics
Olympic wrestlers of Japan
Japanese male sport wrestlers
Wrestlers at the 1962 Asian Games
Wrestlers at the 1966 Asian Games
Medalists at the 1962 Asian Games
Medalists at the 1966 Asian Games
Asian Games medalists in wrestling
Asian Games gold medalists for Japan
Asian Games bronze medalists for Japan
World Wrestling Championships medalists
20th-century Japanese people
21st-century Japanese people